Kauê da Silva, commonly known as Kauê, is a Brazilian footballer who plays as a midfielder for Atlético Goianiense, on loan from Coimbra.

Career
Kauê spent his early career playing the lower divisions of Campeonato Mineiro, representing Uberaba, Ipatinga, Guarani-MG and Coimbra. In 2019 he helped Coimbra to become champion of the Campeonato Mineiro Módulo II, and earned himself a loan to Atlético Goianiense until the end of the 2019 Campeonato Brasileiro Série B season.

He made his national league debut in the Série B game against Cuiabá on 11 June 2019, coming on as a last minute substitute in the 1–0 win.

References

External links
 

Living people
1995 births
Brazilian footballers
Association football midfielders
Uberaba Sport Club players
Ipatinga Futebol Clube players
Guarani Esporte Clube (MG) players
Coimbra Esporte Clube players
Atlético Clube Goianiense players
Campeonato Brasileiro Série B players